Victor Bezerra (born February 5, 2000) is an American professional soccer player who plays as a forward for Major League Soccer club Chicago Fire.

Club career

Youth and college
Bezerra attended Jones College Prep High School, also playing club soccer with the Chicago Fire academy, where he was the number three scorer in the Central Region in the 2018–2019 season with 21 goals in 22 games. With Chicago Bezerra scored 58 official USSDA and eight Generation Adidas goals. Over the years, Bezerra was called to train and develop in multiple youth United States Soccer Federation Camps.

In 2019, Bezerra attended Indiana University Bloomington to play college soccer. In three seasons with the Hoosiers, Bezerra scored 28 goals in 57 appearances, tallying twelve assists, for a total of 68 points (1.2 points per game). During his freshman year, Bezerra led the hoosiers in points and goals with 8 goals and 3 assists, helping the team to win the Big Ten Regular season title and the Big Ten Tournament Title. Bezerra scored a hat-trick at the NCAA tournament game vs University of Kentucky, being the third player in program history to score a postseason hat trick and the first since 2012. As a sophomore, Bezerra was a MAC Hermann Trophy runner-up, after winning both the Big Ten regular season, the Big Ten tournament titles and helping the Hoosiers to reach the Final of the NCAA National Championship. As a sophomore Bezerra was also United Soccer Coaches All-America First Team, Top Drawer Soccer Best XI First Team, United Soccer Coaches All-North Region First Team, Big Ten Offensive Player of the Year, All-Big Ten First Team, Big Ten Offensive Player of the Tournament (leading the conference in goals and points with 28 points, 12 goals and 4 assists in the season), Big Ten All-Tournament Team and elected as IU co-Male Athlete of the Year. In his junior season, Bezerra led the MAC Hermann Trophy watch list, regarded by Top Drawer Soccer as the number one college soccer player in the Country, dealt with injuries at the beginning of the season, led the Hoosiers again in number of goals with 8 goals and 5 assists. Bezerra helped the team to reach the Big Ten Tournament final, finished the season as 1st in All Big Ten on game winning goals and was ranked second in total number of goals scored, earning All-Big Ten Second Team honors. Bezerra scored the decisive winning goal on the NCAA National Tournament first round vs Bowling Green, helping IU to reach the NCAA round of 16 as well as scored the first goal in the NCAA Tournament game vs the NCAA National Championship runner-up Washington University.

Chicago Fire
On December 22, 2021, it was announced that Bezerra had signed a homegrown player contract with Chicago Fire ahead of their 2022 season. He made his professional debut for Chicago on April 19, 2022, appearing as a substitute during a Lamar Hunt U.S. Open Cup tie in regular time versus Union Omaha, Bezerra converted his penalty on the shoot out. His league debut came on May 7, 2022, coming on as an 81st–minute substitute against Atlanta United. In addition to the MLS Games and MLS Next Pro games in 2022, Bezerra also started and played the full game for the Chicago Fire in the friendly  1-1 draw and penalty shoot-out win vs Mexico First Division Liga MX Club León FC   

Bezerra also featured for Chicago Fire FC II during their inaugural MLS Next Pro season in 2022. Bezerra is the goal leading scorer with 8 goals and 2 assists with direct impact in all 8 team wins in games that Bezerra also started.

Personal
Both of Bezerra's parents were born in Brazil and he holds dual nationality.

References

External links

2000 births
Living people
American soccer players
Association football forwards
All-American men's college soccer players
Chicago Fire FC players
Homegrown Players (MLS)
Indiana Hoosiers men's soccer players
Major League Soccer players
MLS Next Pro players
Soccer players from Illinois
Sportspeople from Chicago
Chicago Fire FC II players
American sportspeople of Brazilian descent